The Jushi, or Gushi, were a people who established a kingdom during the 1st millennium BC in the Turpan basin (modern Xinjiang, China). The kingdom included the area of Ayding Lake, in the eastern Tian Shan range. During the late 2nd and early 1st century BC, the area was increasingly dominated by the Han Dynasty and the northern neighbours of the Jushi, the Xiongnu, and became one of the many minor states of the Western Regions of Han dynasty China. The Jushi capital (Jiaohe, later known as Yarkhoto, and Yarghul) was destroyed in a Mongol attack in the 13th century.

They may have been one of the Tocharian peoples and spoken one of the associated languages.

Historical accounts
According to J. P. Mallory and Victor H. Mair, the earliest accounts of the Jushi report them to have "lived in tents, followed the grasses and waters, and had considerable knowledge of agriculture. They owned cattle, horses, camels, sheep and goats. They were proficient with bows and arrows".

Jushi and the kingdom of Krorän were linked in the account of Zhang Qian (d. 113 BC), in part because both were under the control of the Xiongnu.

In or about 60 BC, the Han—ruled at the time by Emperor Xuan—defeated Xiongnu forces at the Battle of Jushi, during the Han–Xiongnu War. Afterwards the main part of the Jushi lands was divided into two states: a southern area controlled by the Han, who referred to it as “Nearer Jushi” (or "Anterior Jushi"), and a northern area known to the Han as “Further Jushi" (or "Posterior Jushi") that was dominated by the Xiongnu. Nearer Jushi was administered by the Han from a capital at Jiaohe (16 kilometres west of the site of modern Turpan). The capital of Further Jushi appears to have been called Yuli or Yulai, and was located about 10 km north of Jimasa, 200 km north of Jiaohe. The Jushi never regained their independence.

Archaeology
A 2,700-year-old grave discovered in 2008 at the Yanghai Tombs, an ancient cemetery (54,000 m2 in area), has been attributed to the Jushi or a precursor culture. The remains belonged probably to a shaman. Near the shaman's head and foot were a large leather basket and wooden bowl filled with 789 grams of dried cannabis, superbly preserved by climatic and burial conditions. An international team demonstrated that this material contained tetrahydrocannabinol, the psychoactive component of cannabis. The cannabis was clearly "cultivated for psychoactive purposes," rather than as fibre for clothing or as food. It may have been employed as a medicinal agent, or an aid to divination. This is the oldest known use of cannabis as a pharmacological agent. The extremely dry conditions and alkaline soil acted as preservatives, allowing a team of scientists to carefully analyze the stash, which still looked green though it had lost its distinctive odour.

See also
 Tarim mummies

References

Citations

Sources 
 Hill, John E. (2009) Through the Jade Gate to Rome: A Study of the Silk Routes during the Later Han Dynasty, 1st to 2nd Centuries CE. BookSurge, Charleston, South Carolina. .
 Hulsewé, A. F. P. (1979). China in Central Asia: The Early Stage 125 BC – AD 23: an annotated translation of chapters 61 and 96 of the History of the Former Han Dynasty. E. J. Brill, Leiden. .

External links
The Kingdom of Nearer
shaman and graveyard found

Former countries in Chinese history
Tarim mummies
History of Xinjiang
Cannabis in China
Han dynasty